Claus Dethloff (born 4 September 1968 in Lübeck, Schleswig-Holstein) is a retired West German hammer thrower.

Dethloff represented the sports clubs MTV Lübeck, LG Frankfurt and LG Bayer Leverkusen, and became German champion in 1995.

His personal best throw was 77.68 metres, achieved in September 1994 in Lübeck.

International competitions

References

sports-reference

1968 births
Living people
Sportspeople from Lübeck
German male hammer throwers
West German male hammer throwers
Olympic athletes of Germany
Athletes (track and field) at the 1992 Summer Olympics
Athletes (track and field) at the 1996 Summer Olympics
World Athletics Championships athletes for Germany